Lovedale may refer to:

Lovedale (South Africa), a mission station and educational institute in Eastern Cape Province, South Africa
Lovedale, India, a Hill Station in Tamil Nadu, India